Down in a Hole is the debut studio album by actor Kiefer Sutherland, produced by Jude Cole from the label Ironworks which Sutherland co-owns. The album was released on August 19, 2016.

Background
Down in a Hole is a country album containing 11 songs written by Sutherland and Cole. The actor first announced his venture in music in 2015. The first single "Not Enough Whiskey" was released on March 28, 2016. Since then, Sutherland went on tour in entire North America with his band and even appeared at the 2016 Academy of Country Music Awards. On August 25, 2016, Sutherland performed on Jimmy Kimmel Live! to promote his album.

The music video for the song "Can't Stay Away" was released on July 27, 2016.

On 6 March 2017, a music video for "I'll Do Anything" was released.

On 28 April 2017, a music video for "Shirley Jean" was released.

Sutherland continued to tour supporting for the album throughout 2017 and 2018.

Track listing

Personnel

 Kiefer Sutherland – lead and background vocals, composer, guitar
 Jude Cole – bass, composer, guitar, keyboards, mandolin, organ, percussion, producer, background vocals
 Jim Cox – organ, piano, wurlitzer
 Florian Ammon – drums, recording
 Keith Armstrong – mixing engineer
 Jason Wade – composer, guitar
 Carmel Echols – background vocals
 Michael Gurley – background vocals
 Chaz Mason – background vocals
 Samantha Nelson – background vocals
 Nik Karpen – mixing engineer

 Aaron Embry – wurlitzer
 Jordan Whitlock – background vocals
 Alan Okuye – organ
 Brian MacLeod – drums, percussion
 Phil Parlapiano – accordion, organ
 Chris Murguia – engineer
 Greg Leisz – guitar, pedal steel guitar
 Patrick Leonard – organ, wurlitzer
 Danny Kastner – piano
 Gavin Lurssen – mastering
 Chris Lord-Alge – mixing, organ
 Rick Woolstenhulme Jr. – drums

Chart performance
The album made its debut at No. 18 on the Americana/Folk Albums chart and No. 35 on Top Country Albums, with 1,000 copies sold according to Nielsen Music.  The album has sold 8,100 copies in the United States as of May 2017.

References

2016 debut albums
Kiefer Sutherland albums
Warner Records albums